This is a list of cricketers who have played first-class, List A or Twenty20 cricket for the Nagaland cricket team, representing the Indian state of Nagaland. The side was established in July 2018 and played its first matches during the 2018–19 Indian cricket season.

The details given are the players name as it would usually appear on match scorecards. Note that some players will have played senior matches for other sides, including the India national cricket team.

A
Abu Nechim Ahmed

B
Rachit Bhatia
Stuart Binny
Chetan Bist

C
Arun Chauhan
Hem Chetri
Nagaho Chishi
Toni Chishi

D
Dhavanath

G
Gaurav
Aditya Gupta

H
Vayu Haralu
Chopise Hopongkyu

I
Walling Imomenba

J
Merenka Jamir
Temjentoshi Jamir
Rohit Jhanjhariya
Rongsen Jonathan

K
Abhishek Kaushik
Abrar Kazi
Khrievitso Kense

L
Imliwati Lemtur
Nitesh Lochab
Aosashi Longchar

M
Ravi Maurya
Nzanthung Mozhui
Shrikant Mundhe

N
Oren Ngullie

O
Joshua Ozukum

P
Bhavik Patel
Kolar Pawan

R
Tahmeed Rahman
Vijay Rai
Kiran Reddy
Sedezhalie Rupero

S
Paras Sehrawat
Rahul Sharma
Manjinder Singh
Pawan Suyal

T
Yogesh Takawale
Moakumzuk Tzudir

U
Jalal Uddin

W
Mughavi Wotsa

Y
Akavi Yeptho
Bohoto Yeptho
Tejosel Yiethun

Z
Hokaito Zhimomi
Inakato Zhimomi
Vino Zhimomi

Notes

References

Nagaland
Lists of people from Nagaland
 List